Lady Bunny, originally known as "Bunny Hickory Dickory Dock" (born Jon Ingle, August 13, 1962), is an American drag queen, nightclub DJ, actor, comedian, and event organizer. She is the founder of the annual Wigstock event, as well as an occasional television and radio personality. She has released disco singles such as "Shame, Shame, Shame!" and "The Pussycat Song", and has hosted two one-woman comedy shows, 'That Ain't No Lady!' and 'Clowns Syndrome'.

Personal life

Early life and education 
Lady Bunny was born in Wilmington, North Carolina, but grew up in Chattanooga, Tennessee, and describes her childhood to have been "wonderful and [she] lucked out in the parents department." Her mother is a retired registered nurse and her father is a history professor at the University of Tennessee at Chattanooga.

Growing up, she would try on costumes and outfits, and put on plays with the other kids in the neighborhood. Her family lived next to a florist and she would collect the thrown out ribbons in the garbage and turn them into costumes for the plays.

When Bunny was 11, her family moved to Ghana for a year to accommodate her father, who had received a Fulbright Scholarship. "It was the best year of my life", she said, remembering banana trees in her backyard and a giant snake that slithered on the road. "I still gag West African cab drivers by speaking the remnants of Fante. I can only say a few things, but it tickles them like crazy." She briefly attended Bootham School, a Quaker boarding school in York, England. Based on her experiences, Bunny regards the English education system to be better than the American one. Upon graduating, she enrolled at the University of Tennessee, where her father teaches, but later relocated to Atlanta, where she attended Georgia State University.

Present 
Lady Bunny says she has an affinity for trans women and has considered transitioning. She spends her public life in drag and uses she/her pronouns. Lady Bunny is seldom seen out of women's clothing. In a 2022 interview, Lady Bunny said "I guess if I had to label myself, I would say I'm probably nonbinary, but I don't feel the need to stipulate."

Lady Bunny currently lives in New York City. She does not often discuss personal matters, and has no known romantic partner or children.

Career

Atlanta 
In Georgia, Lady Bunny met RuPaul. For a time they were go-go dancers for a band called the Now Explosion. Alongside Larry Tee, the two became fixtures on the Atlanta gay scene in the early 1980s. They appeared in a variety of low-budget films, including the Starbooty series. In the episode of RuPaul's Drag Race entitled 'Roast in Peace', RuPaul revealed that he was the first person to ever put Lady Bunny in drag, technically making him her drag mother. RuPaul and Lady Bunny later relocated to New York City together.

New York 
In 1983, Lady Bunny moved to New York City, where she and RuPaul shared an apartment for a time. They worked at the Pyramid Club. She remembers that one of the first times she performed in New York she lip-synced Gloria Gaynor's "I Will Survive" and fell during the performance, losing her wig and a shoe. Bunny's performance style during this period blended lip sync, dance, and comedy. Her performances often included self-deprecating commentary, and short criticism of other performers broken up by short bits of dancing. During this period, she also held several odd jobs such as working in an ice cream parlor and in sales for publisher Ralph Ginzburg.

Soon, Lady Bunny became one of the Club Kids and in 1985, she organized the first Wigstock, an annual drag queen festival that lasted until 2005, and was later revived in 2018. The idea to revive Wigstock came from Neil Patrick Harris' husband, David Burtka. Wigstock became the subject of Chris Moukarbel's 2019 documentary Wig, which included Debbie Harry, Kevin Aviance, Willam, and Neil Patrick Harris.

Performance 
Lady Bunny is known for her "big curves, bigger hair" and is one of the legendary and ubiquitous New York City drag queens that is still performing today. She is a staple of New York Fashion Week, she tours alongside cabaret shows, and DJs around the globe. She was DJ at Van Cleef & Arpels' 40th anniversary party in Paris and for the Standard's Black Out Party, which celebrated the 25th anniversary of Naomi Campbell's fashion career. Lady Bunny is the regular DJ for Empire State Pride Agenda and has served as the in-house DJ for Visionaire and V Magazine. Lady Bunny is a huge music aficionado. Her favorite Blondie song is Fade Away and Radiate. Hideaway by Canadian musical Kiesza is a pop song Lady Bunny regularly spins during DJ sets for its popular and underrated appeal. Lady Bunny has been releasing her own original music since 1996. Lady Bunny has written and run two one-woman comedy shows at LGBT club La Escuelita, 'That Ain't No Lady!' and 'Clowns Syndrome', the latter receiving praise from the New York Times. Both comedy shows toured globally.

Bunny can put together a full drag look within 20 minutes and maintains that every drag look must include faux lashes and a good wig. Her style of drag performance is comedic and often involves the parodying of popular songs. She most often appears in blonde wigs, and frequently performs at XL Nightclub. She has shared the stage with other popular New York City Drag Queens like Bianca del Rio. Lady Bunny was featured on the European leg of the Werq the World Tour.

Lady Bunny is featured prominently in "The Tyranny of Consciousness", a 2017 five-channel video installation by video artist Charles Atlas, which premiered at "Viva Arte Viva", the 2017 Venice Biennale, curated by Christine Maciel. The video is now in the permanent collection of the Hammer Museum, Los Angeles.

During the COVID-19 pandemic, Lady Bunny produced an online drag show called 'Cuntagious'. In January 2021, she launched a podcast, Ebony and Irony, co-hosted by Monét X Change.

Lady Bunny has appeared in films such as Party Girl, Wigstock: The Movie, Wig, Peoria Babylon, Starrbooty, Another Gay Movie, and To Wong Foo, Thanks for Everything! Julie Newmar.

Television 
In 2005, she was a roaster on the Comedy Central roast of Pamela Anderson and released her first DVD, Rated X for X-tra Retarded.

Lady Bunny served on the judges' panel on the spinoff show RuPaul's Drag U, which aired on the Logo TV network from 2010 to 2012. Lady Bunny was Dean of Drag and had a role of judge in the first season. In season 2 of RuPaul's Drag U, the Dean of Drag role was expanded into a segment called "Lady Lessons". During the fifth season of RuPaul's Drag Race, contestant Alaska Thunderfuck 5000 impersonated Bunny for the Snatch Game. Episode 5 ("Roast in Peace") of the fourth season of RuPaul's Drag Race All Stars features a roast of Lady Bunny at a mock funeral.

In 2003, Lady Bunny made a guest appearance in the Sex and the City episode "Boy, Interrupted", as the emcee at the LGBT prom.

In 2021, Lady Bunny featured in NewsBeat, a news show written by Luke Evendon with executive producer Clay Aiken.

Writing 
Lady Bunny worked as a commentator for Star Magazine's 'Worst of the Week' column. She has also written for Paper Magazine, Interview, Out, Time Out, Visionaire, and Huffington Post. According to her own website, she is currently working on a memoir.

Awards and nominations
 2009 GayVN Awards winner of Best Non-Sex Performance in "Brothers' Reunion" (Lucas Entertainment).
 2009 AmfAR's Honoring with Pride Honoree

See also
 LGBT culture in New York City
 List of LGBT people from New York City

References

  Text was copied from Lady Bunny at RuPaul's Drag Race Wiki, which is released under a Creative Commons Attribution-Share Alike 3.0 (Unported) (CC-BY-SA 3.0) license.

External links

 
Lady Bunny on the MikeyPod Podcast

1962 births
Living people
American dance musicians
American drag queens
American television personalities
LGBT people from Tennessee
Nightlife in New York City
People from Chattanooga, Tennessee